Death's Head, death's head or death's-head may refer to:

 Skull and crossbones (symbol)
 Death's head cockroach (Blaberus craniifer), a species of cockroach
 Death's-head hawkmoth, the common name for three species of moth
 Death's Head, a Marvel character
 Death's-Head (comics), a Marvel character and enemy of Daredevil
 Death's Head (series), science fiction novels by David Gunn
 The official "death's head" insignia design of the Hells Angels Motorcycle Club.
 Totenkopf (German; literally "death's head"), a military insignia
 The Blood Beast Terror, also known as The Deathshead Vampire, a 1968 British horror film starring Peter Cushing

See also
 Human skull symbolism

Animal common name disambiguation pages